Naruto Shippuden: Ultimate Ninja Blazing, known as  in Japan, was the first mobile platform game in the Naruto: Ultimate Ninja game series published by Bandai Namco Entertainment. It was a turn-based action role-playing game, and it was available on iOS and Android. The game had a Japanese and English versions.

In April 2017 the game announced 10 million downloads, and a year later, 15 million downloads.

In 2017, the game grossed  in China.

It ended service on February 9, 2021.

Gameplay and content
Players engaged in combat by strategically moving their characters. These characters could level up, known as ‘awakening,’ to beat stronger opponents. After that, they could ‘limit break,’ to achieve an even stronger state. The game featured the following playable game modes: Story, Emergency Mission (Missions to get items that improve your characters or new characters), Trial Missions (get Trial Coins to Limit Break characters), Phantom Castle (fight against Teams of other players and ascend to Floor 100), Ninja Road (get an Acquisition Stone to unlock an ability of a character you own by beating all 20 maps in a row), Ninja World Clash (PvP: Build a Team and play against online opponents). The game was free to play and offered in-app purchase.

Reception

The game received relatively positive reviews on its release. An Italian reviewer concluded that "is a simple but fun turn-based strategy game, with plenty of missions and characters to unlock.", awarding it 7.5 out of 10. This sentiments was shared by a number of other reviewers: "fun but repetitive", "not revolutionary... but... easy-going experience". Vincent Haoson reviewing it for MMOhuts noted that while the game has some minor issues, it is "one of the better F2P mobile titles out there", awarding it a 4/5 score.

The game was described as "one of Bandai Namco’s biggest Android titles this [2016] summer".

References 

2016 video games
Android (operating system) games
Fighting games
Naruto video games
IOS games
Gacha games
Japanese role-playing video games
Single-player video games
Multiplayer video games
Video games developed in Japan
Inactive online games